Balcılar (literally "honey sellers" or "beekeepers") is a Turkish place name that may refer to the following places in Turkey:

 Balcılar, Bismil
 Balcılar, Çüngüş
 Balcılar, Gerede, a village in the district of Gerede, Bolu Province
 Balcılar, Kızılcahamam, a village in the district of Kızılcahamam, Ankara Province
 Balcılar, Lapseki
 Balcılar, Taşkent, a town in the district of Taşkent, Konya Province

See also
 Balcı (disambiguation), the singular form